Francisco Manuel Silveira is an Indian politician. He was elected to the Goa Legislative Assembly from St. Andre in the 1999, 2002, 2007, 2017 Goa Legislative Assembly election as a member of the Indian National Congress. He was one of the ten members of Indian National Congress who joined Bharatiya Janata Party in July 2019.

References

Members of the Goa Legislative Assembly
1968 births
Living people
Former members of Indian National Congress from Goa
People from North Goa district
Goa MLAs 2017–2022
Bharatiya Janata Party politicians from Goa